The 2019 BFF U-18 Football Tournament (also known as Walton U-18 Football Tournament for sponsorship reason), It was the 3rd edition of BFF U-18 Football Tournament, a youth club football tournament in Bangladesh hosted by the Bangladesh Football Federation.The main goal of this tournament to produce future football players for Bangladesh national football team and clubs.

Draw
The draw ceremony were held at BFF house at Motijheel, Dhaka on 31 July 2019. The 12 teams were divided into 4 groups. Top two teams from each group will qualified for Quarter-finals.

Round Matches Dates

Venue

Note:The final match venue have shifted to BSSSM Mostafa Kamal Stadium due to bad surface of Bangabandhu National Stadium.

Officials
Referres

 Bovon Mohon Talukdar
 Md Jalaluddin 

 Iqbal Alam
 
 Shohrab Hossain
 Mizanur Rahman
 Osman Gani
 Shafiqul Islam Imon
 Ahmed Gordow
 G. Chawdhury Nayan
 Fareed Ahmed

Group stage
All matches will be played at Dhaka, Bangladesh.
Times listed are UTC+6:00.

Group A

Group B

Group C

Group D

Knockout stage
 All matches are held at Dhaka
 Time listed UTC+6:00
 In the knockout stage, extra time and penalty shoot-out are used to decide the winner if necessary.

Bracket

As Saidu Alias Ramiz of Chittagong Abahani U-18 was found guilty of providing a false identity and conceal his true age according to the article 21.2 and 38.6 of the Walton U-18 football tournament’s bylaws, Dhaka Abahani U-18 were declared winner by 3-0.

Quarter-finals

Semi-finals

Final

Goalscorers

References

2019 in Bangladeshi football
Youth football in Bangladesh
Football leagues in Bangladesh